Scandinavium is a genus of Gram-negative, facultative anaerobic, oxidase-negative, rod-shaped, motile bacteria of the family Enterobacteriaceae. It contains a single species, Scandinavium goeteborgense. The type strain of the species is S. goeteborgense CCUG 66741T = CECT 9823T = NCTC 14286T and its genome sequence is publicly available in DNA Data Bank of Japan, European Nucleotide Archive and GenBank under the accession number LYLP00000000.

References

Enterobacteriaceae
Bacteria described in 2020